Kurt Szilier (born 11 January 1957) is a Romanian gymnast. He competed in eight events at the 1980 Summer Olympics.

References

1957 births
Living people
Romanian male artistic gymnasts
Olympic gymnasts of Romania
Gymnasts at the 1980 Summer Olympics
People from Lugoj